Adela Garcia (born December 1, 1971) is an IFBB professional fitness competitor and former Ms. IFBB Fitness Olympia.

Biography

Adela was born on December 1, 1971, in Cabrera, Dominican Republic and moved to San Juan, Puerto Rico at age eight. In school, she played softball, volleyball, and basketball. She started weight training at age 17.

Adela started competing in 1995, with the goal of becoming a fitness professional. She earned her pro card in 1999 by winning the NPC USA Fitness Championships. In 2000, she made her pro debut at the Ms. Fitness International, finishing eighth. Later that year, she qualified for the 2000 Ms. Fitness Olympia by placing ninth place at the Jan Tana Classic. Adela has won several professional titles, most notably the 2004 and 2006 Fitness Olympia, and the 2004 and 2006 Fitness International.
For several years, she was married to Brian Friedmansky, and competed as Adela Garcia-Friedmansky. She was engaged to bodybuilder Lee Priest.   According to his column in Muscular Development Magazine, Adela and Lee Priest are no longer together and have parted on amicable terms.

Stats

Took part in IFBB Fitness Olympia competition 13 times (2000-2013, except 2008)

Contest history

1995 NPC Europa Sports Fitness Championship - 2nd
1996 NPC National Fitness Championship - 12th
1996 NPC Pennsylvania Fitness Championship - 4th
1998 NPC USA Fitness Championship - 9th (short class)
1998 NPC National Fitness Championship - 8th (short class)
1998 IFBB North American Fitness Championship - 6th (short class)
1998 NPC Junior National Fitness Championship - 2nd (short class)
1999 NPC USA Fitness Championship - Overall winner
2000 IFBB Fitness International - 8th
2000 IFBB Atlantic City Pro Fitness - 6th
2000 IFBB Pittsburgh Pro Fitness -5th
2000 IFBB Fitness Olympia - 5th
2000 IFBB Jan Tana Classic Pro Fitness - 2nd
2001 IFBB Fitness International - 3rd
2001 IFBB Pittsburgh Pro Fitness - 3rd
2001 IFBB Fitness Olympia - 4th
2002 IFBB Fitness International - 4th
2002 IFBB New York Pro Fitness - 1st
2002 IFBB Atlantic States Pro Fitness - 1st
2002 IFBB Pittsburgh Pro Fitness - 1st
2002 IFBB Fitness Olympia - 4th
2002 IFBB GNC Show of Strength Fitness - 2nd
2003 IFBB Fitness International - 2nd
2003 IFBB New York Pro Fitness - 1st
2004 IFBB Fitness International - 1st
2004 IFBB Fitness Olympia - 1st
2005 IFBB Fitness International - 2nd
2005 IFBB Fitness Olympia - 3rd
2005 IFBB Sacramento Pro Fitness - 1st
2006 IFBB Fitness International - 1st
2006 IFBB Fitness Olympia - 1st
2007 IFBB Fitness International - 3rd
2007 IFBB Houston Pro Figure Contest - 3rd
2007 IFBB Europa Super Show - 1st
2007 IFBB Fitness Olympia - 1st
2009 IFBB Fitness Olympia - 1st
2010 IFBB Fitness International - 1st
2010 IFBB Fitness Olympia - 1st
2011 IFBB Fitness International - 1st
2011 IFBB Fitness Olympia - 1st
2012 IFBB Fitness International - 1st
2012 IFBB Fitness Olympia - 1st
2013 IFBB Fitness Olympia - 1st

See also 
 List of female fitness & figure competitors

References

External links
Official web site

1971 births
Living people
Fitness and figure competitors